Jah Division is a Russian reggae band.  It is one of the oldest reggae bands in Russia, formed in early 1990s in Moscow.

History 
Founder of the band Herbert Morales aka Gera Morales — son of a Cuban revolutionary Leopoldo Morales an associate of Che Guevara.

Morales worked together for a while with a band Комитетом охраны тепла (Komitet ohrany tepla / The Committee of Protection of Heat) as guitarist in concerts and session guitarist in studio.

In Russia and CIS band has cult status and well known among reggae fans. But fame goes beyond Rastafarian subculture. First TV broadcast of Jah Division was happened in 1992 at one of central TV channels. Since Morales repeatedly invited by different broadcasts alone or with other musicians of band. He constantly gives interview for newspapers and  magazines. Morales starred in a cameo role as a drug dealer in film «Get out of here».

Creative career of Jah Division started from personal contribution of Morales as poet and musician. Having a vague idea about reggae playing Gera Morales acquired theoretical foundations by interviewing African students. In 1988 was a first concert of Morales with his own songs in Ladoga club.

In 1991 year was a first concert of Jah Division band with tracklist of five songs in Journalist Home in 1991 year. Among visitors of concerts was a lot of punks and Boris Grebenshikov.

Herbert Morales became the founder of the ideological Rastafarian image thanks to dreadlocks, braided for him by reggae musicians friends in 1991 year (Dim-Dim, Philp Nikonorov, Oldy and others).

This year musicians of Jah Division published manifest rastafarian movement in Russia. First performance with full tracklist was in 1992 in the Forpost club at fest dedicated to birthday of Bob Marley. Except Jah Division at this fest played bands: Komitet ohrany tepla, band of Dima Vasilyev, Tretya Gran. Then Morales helped for Komitet ohrany tepla to record its first studio album. This year was a performance in Riga at the reggae fest organized by Karl Khlamkin.

Except Russia Jah Division toured in Latvia, Germany, Poland, Montenegro, Estonia, India and Cis countries. In 2008 «Jah Division» participated in the international reggae-festival Ostroda,  where they played on the same stage with the luminaries of the genre — Maxim Romeo and Ijahman Levi and others. Also this year the band start to record new album in Poland.

Gerbert Morales collaborates with reggae band Dubska from Poland, recorded the common LP album ДабскаДивижн and performed on the different Poland fests. In summer 2011 Jah Division demonstrated new sound of band at Perm's White Night festival.

Discography 
 1992 — Индюки златоглавые (Indyuki zlatoglavye / Golden-headed turkeys) (live) [MC]
 1994 — Концерт в ДК Горбунова (Concert at the Gorbunov recreation center) (live) [MC]
 1995 — Cubana [MC]
 2000 — Jah Division
 2001 — Live in Forpost club
 2001 — Ten years of Jah division (live in Forpost club) [MC]
 2002 — Live in Warsaw
 2002 — The single
 2002 — Пассионарии Джа. День независимости (Passionarii Jah. Den nezavisimosti / Passionaries of Jah. Independence day)
 2003 — Recycled
 2003 — Пассионарии Джа (live in Forpost club)  (Passionarii Jah / Passionaries of Jah)
 2004 — The best
 2004 — День рождения (live) (Den rojdenya / Birthday)
 2005 — Cubana
 2006 — Закат (Zakat / Sunset)
 2007 — All music
 2007 — Эссенция (Essenciya/ Essence)
 2009 — Гений пламенных речей  (Geniy plmennyh rechey / Genius of fiery speeches) (Maxi-Single)
 2012 — Поднимайте сердца  (Podnimayte serdca / Raise your hearts) (feat. NetSlov) (Maxi-Single)

References

Literature 
 Alexeev A.A. - Who is who in Russian rock

External links 
 Official website
 Morales in Twitter
Jah Division in livejournal
 JD in library of Maxim Moshkov
 Rastafari in Russia 

Russian reggae musicians
Musical groups from Moscow
1991 establishments in Russia